The 1905 Penn Quakers football team represented the University of Pennsylvania in the 1905 college football season. The Quakers finished with an undefeated 12–0–1 record in their fourth year under head coach Carl S. Williams. Significant games included a 6 to 0 victory over the Carlisle Indians, a 12 to 6 victory over Harvard, a 23 to 0 victory over Columbia, a 6 to 5 victory over Cornell, and a 6–6 tie with Lafayette.  The 1905 Penn team outscored its opponents by a combined total of 259 to 33.

Six Penn players received recognition on the 1905 College Football All-America Team. They are: end Izzy Levene (WC-3; NYW; NYG); tackle Otis Lamson (WC-1; CW-1; NYEP; NYW; NYG; NYEP; NYT; NYG); guard F. Hobson (NYEP; NYG); center Robert Torrey (WC-1; CW-1; NYEP; NYT; NYW; NYG); quarterback Vince Stevenson (NYW); and halfback H.W. Sheble (WC-2).

Schedule

References

Penn
Penn Quakers football seasons
Penn Quakers football